Watkins is an unincorporated community in DeWitt and McLean counties, Illinois, United States.

References

Unincorporated communities in DeWitt County, Illinois
Unincorporated communities in McLean County, Illinois
Unincorporated communities in Illinois